Szold is a surname. Notable people with the surname include:

Benjamin Szold (1829–1902), Hungarian-American rabbi
Henrietta Szold (1860–1945), founder of the Hadassah Women's Organization
Nadia Szold (born 28 September 1984), filmmaker
 Robert Szold (1889–1977), American lawyer, Zionist movement leader 
Zip Szold (1888-1979), fourth president of the Hadassah Women's Zionist Organization of America

See also
Kfar Szold, a kibbutz in Israel, named after Henrietta Szold